Charm (symbol C) is a flavour quantum number representing the difference between the number of charm quarks  and charm antiquarks that are present in a particle:

By convention, the sign of flavour quantum numbers agree with the sign of the electric charge carried by the quarks of corresponding flavour. The charm quark, which carries an electric charge (Q) of +, therefore carries a charm of +1. The charm antiquarks have the opposite charge, and flavour quantum numbers.

As with any flavour-related quantum numbers, charm is preserved under strong and electromagnetic interaction, but not under weak interaction (see CKM matrix). For first-order weak decays, that is processes involving only one quark decay, charm can only vary by 1. Since first-order processes are more common than second-order processes (involving two quark decays), this can be used as an approximate "selection rule" for weak decays.

See also
 Quantum number

References

Further reading
Lessons in Particle Physics Luis Anchordoqui and Francis Halzen, University of Wisconsin, 18th Dec. 2009

Quarks
Flavour (particle physics)

he:קסם (פיזיקה)